The Margaret Beaufort Institute of Theology is a Roman Catholic theological college in Cambridge, England. The institute was founded in 1993 to provide religious and theological education to Catholic laywomen: it now offers theological education to both women and men, and to both Catholics and non-Catholics. It is named for Lady Margaret Beaufort, mother of King Henry VII. The institute is part of the Cambridge Theological Federation, through which courses and degrees are validated by either the University of Cambridge or Anglia Ruskin University.

In November 2022, the college put its  12–14 Grange Road site up for sale for £5 million.

Principals
 1993–2005 Sr Bridget Tighe, FMDM
 2006–2011 Dr Susan O'Brien
 2012–2017 Dr Oonagh O'Brien
 2017–  Dr Anna Abram

References

External links
 Margaret Beaufort Institute of Theology

Catholic universities and colleges in England
Educational institutions established in 1993
Catholic Church in Cambridge
Institutions of the Cambridge Theological Federation
1993 establishments in England